The 2010–11 New Jersey Devils season was the 37th season for the National Hockey League franchise that was established on June 11, 1974, and 29th season since the franchise relocated from Colorado prior to the 1982–83 NHL season.

The Devils posted a regular season record of 38 wins, 39 losses and 5 overtime/shootout losses for 81 points, failing to qualify for the Stanley Cup playoffs for the first time since the 1995–96 season, ending their 13-season playoff streak. This was the first time the Devils finished the season with a losing record since the 1990–91 season. Their 174 goals scored were the lowest ever amount for the Devils in a non-lockout shortened season.

Off-season
On April 26, 2010, Jacques Lemaire announced that he would retire from coaching. On June 17, the New Jersey Devils announced that John MacLean would become the 19th head coach in the franchise's history. On June 29, the Devils announced that former NHL player Adam Oates will be the assistant coach for the team for the 2010–11 season.

On July 19, Ilya Kovalchuk re-signed with the Devils to a 17-year, $102 million contract. The contract was front-loaded with minimal payments in the last few seasons, when Kovalchuk would be in his 40s and unlikely to play. The deal was subsequently rejected by the NHL as a circumvention of the NHL collective bargaining agreement. The Devils stated after the NHL rejection that they would appeal the decision under the "collective bargaining agreement" process. On August 8, arbitrator Richard Bloch upheld the NHL's rejection of the contract, rendering Kovalchuk an unrestricted free agent again. On September 4, the Devils re-submitted another contract to the NHL worth $100 million to be paid over 15 years. The deal was approved by the NHL the following week as part of an NHL–National Hockey League Players' Association agreement concerning contracts over five years in length.

Regular season 
An injury to Bryce Salvador allowed the Devils to avoid a major trade before the start of the regular season. They opened their regular season at home on October 8 with a 4–3 overtime loss to the Dallas Stars with only 20 players on the roster. Subsequent injuries to Anton Volchenkov and Brian Rolston, as well as a one-game suspension of Pierre-Luc Letourneau-Leblond after a 7–2 loss to the Washington Capitals, dropped the roster size to 17. The team and management have been under scrutiny for the decision to dress as few as 15 men (and two goaltenders) as a result of having too few funds for an average-sized roster.

After an NHL-worst 9–22–2 start to the season, John MacLean was fired as head coach, and Jacques Lemaire, who had retired as the Devils' head coach in the off-season, was hired as interim head coach.

Following the trade of captain Jamie Langenbrunner, the Devils managed an astonishing turnaround. After the start of the second half of the season, the Devils saw a dramatic increase in offensive production, in addition to the outstanding performance by backup goaltender Johan Hedberg. The Devils turned their record around from 10–29–2 on January 9 to 32–32–4 by March 12, with a point percentage of over 80% during their 22–3–2 stretch. Following a win against New York Islanders on March 12, the Devils found themselves six points out of the final playoff berth with a game in hand on the eighth-placed New York Rangers, and a hope of making the playoffs for a 14th consecutive season had been renewed among the fans. The team faded, however, finishing 12 points behind the Rangers.

With the injured Zach Parise missing 69 of the Devils' 82 regular season games, the team struggled offensively, finishing 30th overall in goals scored with just 171 (excluding three shootout-winning goals). They also finished 30th overall in power-play goals scored, with 34, and power-play opportunities, with 237. However, the Devils were the most disciplined team in the league once again, with only 241 power-play opportunities against, and they tied the Los Angeles Kings for the fewest power-play goals allowed with 40.

At the conclusion of the season, head coach Jacques Lemaire announced that he would not return to coach the Devils in the 2011–12 season.

Playoffs
Following a 3–1 loss to the Montreal Canadiens on April 2, the Devils were eliminated from playoff contention for the first time since 1996.

Media
This season was Mike Emrick's final season as the television play-by-play announcer for the New Jersey Devils since he moved to NBC Sports. Steve Cangialosi would replace Emrick the following year. However, Chico Resch continued to be a TV color commentator. Radio coverage was still on WFAN with Matt Loughlin and Sherry Ross.

Standings

Divisional standings

Conference standings

Schedule and results

Pre-season

|- align="center" bgcolor="BBBBBB"
| 1 || September 21 || Philadelphia Flyers || 3-4 (SO) || Wells Fargo Center || 19,288 || 0-0-1
|- align="center" bgcolor="BBBBBB"
| 2 || September 23 || New York Rangers || 3-4 (OT) || Madison Square Garden || 14,987 || 0-0-2
|- align="center" bgcolor="BBBBBB"
| 3 || September 25 || New York Rangers || 4-5 (OT) || Prudential Center || 13,821 || 0-0-3
|- align="center" bgcolor="CCFFCC"
| 4 || September 28 || Philadelphia Flyers || 3-2 || Prudential Center || 10,124 || 1-0-3
|- align="center" bgcolor="CCFFCC"
| 5 || October 1 || New York Islanders || 4-3 || Prudential Center || 13,596 || 2-0-3
|- aligh="center" bgcolor="FFBBBB"
| 6 || October 2 || New York Islanders || 1-2 || Nassau Veterans Memorial Coliseum || 7,783 || 2-1-3
|-

Regular season

|- align="center" bgcolor="BBBBBB"
| 1 || 8 || Dallas Stars || 3-4 (OT) || Prudential Center||17,625 || 0-0-1 || 1
|- align="center" bgcolor="FFBBBB"
| 2 || 9 || @ Washington Capitals || 2-7 || Verizon Center||18,398 || 0-1-1 || 1
|- align="center" bgcolor="FFBBBB"
| 3 || 11 || Pittsburgh Penguins || 1-3 || Prudential Center||12,880 || 0-2-1 || 1
|- align="center" bgcolor="CCFFCC"
| 4 || 13 || @ Buffalo Sabres || 1-0 (OT) || HSBC Arena||18,690 || 1-2-1 || 3
|- align="center" bgcolor="FFBBBB"
| 5 || 15 || Colorado Avalanche || 2-3 || Prudential Center||12,221 || 1-3-1 || 3
|- align="center" bgcolor="FFBBBB"
| 6 || 16 || Boston Bruins || 1-4 || Prudential Center||13,056 || 1-4-1 || 3
|- align="center" bgcolor="CCFFCC"
| 7 || 21 || @ Montreal Canadiens || 3-0 || Bell Centre||21,273 || 2-4-1 || 5
|- align="center" bgcolor="FFBBBB"
| 8 || 23 || Buffalo Sabres || 1-6 || Prudential Center||14,228 || 2-5-1 || 5
|- align="center" bgcolor="FFBBBB"
| 9 || 24 || @ New York Rangers || 1-3 || Madison Square Garden||18,200 || 2-6-1 || 5
|- align="center" bgcolor="FFBBBB"
| 10 || 27 || @ San Jose Sharks || 2-5 || HP Pavilion||17,562 || 2-7-1 || 5
|- align="center" bgcolor="CCFFCC"
| 11 || 29 || @ Anaheim Ducks || 2-1 || Honda Center||14,724 || 3-7-1 || 7
|- align="center" bgcolor="FFBBBB"
| 12 || 30 || @ Los Angeles Kings || 1-3 || Staples Center||18,118 || 3-8-1 || 7
|-

|- align="center" bgcolor="FFBBBB"
| 13 || 1 || @ Vancouver Canucks || 0-3 || Rogers Arena||18,860 || 3-9-1 || 7
|- align="center" bgcolor="CCFFCC"
| 14 || 3 || @ Chicago Blackhawks || 5-3 || United Center||21,044 || 4-9-1 || 9
|- align="center" bgcolor="FFBBBB"
| 15 || 5 || New York Rangers || 0-3 || Prudential Center||17,625 || 4-10-1 || 9
|- align="center" bgcolor="BBBBBB"
| 16 || 10 || Buffalo Sabres || 4-5 (SO) || Prudential Center||14,566 || 4-10-2 || 10
|- align="center" bgcolor="CCFFCC"
| 17 || 12 || Edmonton Oilers || 4-3 (OT) || Prudential Center||14,650 || 5-10-2 || 12
|- align="center" bgcolor="FFBBBB"
| 18 || 15 || @ Boston Bruins || 0-3 || TD Garden||17,565 || 5-11-2 || 12
|- align="center" bgcolor="FFBBBB"
| 19 || 18 || @ Toronto Maple Leafs || 1-3 || Air Canada Centre||19,271 || 5-12-2 || 12
|- align="center" bgcolor="FFBBBB"
| 20 || 20 || @ St. Louis Blues || 2-3 || Scottrade Center||19,150 || 5-13-2 || 12
|- align="center" bgcolor="CCFFCC"
| 21 || 22 || Washington Capitals || 5-0 || Prudential Center||14,107 || 6-13-2 || 14
|- align="center" bgcolor="CCFFCC"
| 22 || 24 || Calgary Flames || 2-1 (SO) || Prudential Center||13,202 || 7-13-2 || 16
|- align="center" bgcolor="FFBBBB"
| 23 || 26 || @ New York Islanders || 0-2 || Nassau Veterans Memorial Coliseum||10,897 || 7-14-2 || 16
|- align="center" bgcolor="CCFFCC"
| 24 || 27 || Philadelphia Flyers || 2-1 (SO) || Prudential Center||17,625 || 8-14-2 || 18
|-

|- align="center" bgcolor="FFBBBB"
| 25 || 2 || Montreal Canadiens || 1-5 || Prudential Center||11,434 || 8-15-2 || 18
|- align="center" bgcolor="FFBBBB"
| 26 || 4 || @ Philadelphia Flyers || 3-5 || Wells Fargo Center || 19,657 || 8-16-2 || 18
|- align="center" bgcolor="FFBBBB"
| 27 || 6 || @ Pittsburgh Penguins || 1-2 || Consol Energy Center||18,185 || 8-17-2 || 18
|- align="center" bgcolor="FFBBBB"
| 28 || 10 || @ Ottawa Senators || 2-3 || Scotiabank Place||16,471 || 8-18-2 || 18
|- align="center" bgcolor="FFBBBB"
| 29 || 11 || Detroit Red Wings || 1-4 || Prudential Center||17,625 || 8-19-2 || 18
|- align="center" bgcolor="CCFFCC"
| 30 || 15 || Phoenix Coyotes || 3-0 || Prudential Center||13,208 || 9-19-2 || 20
|- align="center" bgcolor="FFBBBB"
| 31 || 17 || Nashville Predators || 1-3 || Prudential Center||14,137 || 9-20-2 || 20
|- align="center" bgcolor="FFBBBB"
| 32 || 18 || @ Atlanta Thrashers || 1-7 || Philips Arena||17,024 || 9-21-2 || 20
|- align="center" bgcolor="FFBBBB"
| 33 || 21 || @ Washington Capitals || 1-5 || Verizon Center||18,398 || 9-22-2 || 20
|- align="center" bgcolor="FFBBBB"
| 34 || 23 || New York Islanders || 1-5 || Prudential Center||13,312 || 9-23-2 || 20
|- align="center" bgcolor="FFBBBB"
| 35 || 26 || Toronto Maple Leafs || 1-4 || Prudential Center||5,329 || 9-24-2 || 20
|- align="center" bgcolor="FFBBBB"
| 36 || 29 || New York Rangers || 1-3 || Prudential Center||17,625 || 9-25-2 || 20
|- align="center" bgcolor="CCFFCC"
| 37 || 31 || Atlanta Thrashers || 3-1 || Prudential Center||13,492 || 10-25-2 || 22
|-

|- align="center" bgcolor="FFBBBB"
| 38 || 1 || @ Carolina Hurricanes || 3-6 || RBC Center||16,107 || 10-26-2 || 22
|- align="center" bgcolor="FFBBBB"
| 39 || 4 || Minnesota Wild || 1-2 || Prudential Center||13,257 || 10-27-2 || 22
|- align="center" bgcolor="FFBBBB"
| 40 || 6 || Philadelphia Flyers || 2-4 || Prudential Center||15,098 || 10-28-2 || 22
|- align="center" bgcolor="FFBBBB"
| 41 || 8 || @ Philadelphia Flyers || 1-2 || Wells Fargo Center||19,859 || 10-29-2 || 22
|- align="center" bgcolor="CCFFCC"
| 42 || 9 || Tampa Bay Lightning || 6-3 || Prudential Center||16,194 || 11-29-2 || 24
|- align="center" bgcolor="CCFFCC"
| 43 || 14 || @ Tampa Bay Lightning || 5-2 || St. Pete Times Forum||18,736 || 12-29-2 || 26
|- align="center" bgcolor="BBBBBB"
| 44 || 15 || @ Florida Panthers || 2-3 (OT) || BankAtlantic Center||17,825 || 12-29-3 || 27
|- align="center" bgcolor="CCFFCC"
| 45 || 17 || @ New York Islanders || 5-2 || Nassau Veterans Memorial Coliseum||13,119 || 13-29-3 || 29
|- align="center" bgcolor="CCFFCC"
| 46 || 20 || Pittsburgh Penguins || 2-0 || Prudential Center||14,890 || 14-29-3 || 31
|- align="center" bgcolor="CCFFCC"
| 47 || 22 || @ Philadelphia Flyers || 3-1 || Wells Fargo Center||19,847 || 15-29-3 || 33
|- align="center" bgcolor="CCFFCC"
| 48 || 23 || Florida Panthers || 5-2 || Prudential Center||15,109 || 16-29-3 || 35
|- align="center" bgcolor="FFBBBB"
| 49 || 26 || @ Detroit Red Wings || 1-3 || Joe Louis Arena||20,066 || 16-30-3 || 35
|-

|- align="center" bgcolor="CCFFCC"
| 50 || 1 || Ottawa Senators || 2-1 || Prudential Center||7,218 || 17-30-3 || 37
|- align="center" bgcolor="CCFFCC"
| 51 || 3 || @ New York Rangers || 3-2 || Madison Square Garden||18,200 || 18-30-3 || 39
|- align="center" bgcolor="BBBBBB"
| 52 || 4 || Florida Panthers || 3-4 (OT) || Prudential Center||13,577 || 18-30-4 || 40
|- align="center" bgcolor="CCFFCC"
| 53 || 6 || @ Montreal Canadiens || 4-1 || Bell Centre||21,273 || 19-30-4 || 42
|- align="center" bgcolor="CCFFCC"
| 54 || 8 || Carolina Hurricanes || 3-2 (OT) || Prudential Center||12,126 || 20-30-4 || 44
|- align="center" bgcolor="CCFFCC"
| 55 || 10 || @ Toronto Maple Leafs || 2-1 (OT) || Air Canada Centre||19,260 || 21-30-4 || 46
|- align="center" bgcolor="CCFFCC"
| 56 || 11 || San Jose Sharks || 2-1 || Prudential Center||17,102 || 22-30-4 || 48
|- align="center" bgcolor="CCFFCC"
| 57 || 16 || Carolina Hurricanes || 3-2 || Prudential Center||14,445 || 23-30-4 || 50
|- align="center" bgcolor="CCFFCC"
| 58 || 18 || New York Rangers || 1-0 || Prudential Center||17,625 || 24-30-4 || 52
|- align="center" bgcolor="CCFFCC"
| 59 || 19 || @ Carolina Hurricanes || 4-1 || RBC Center||17,890 || 25-30-4 || 54
|- align="center" bgcolor="CCFFCC"
| 60 || 22 || @ Dallas Stars || 1-0 || American Airlines Center||13,652 || 26-30-4 || 56
|- align="center" bgcolor="FFBBBB"
| 61 || 25 || @ Tampa Bay Lightning || 1-2 || St. Pete Times Forum||19,563 || 26-31-4 || 56
|- align="center" bgcolor="CCFFCC"
| 62 || 27 || @ Florida Panthers || 2-1 || BankAtlantic Center||16,592 || 27-31-4 || 58
|-

|- align="center" bgcolor="CCFFCC"
| 63 || 2 || Tampa Bay Lightning || 2-1 || Prudential Center||12,857 || 28-31-4 || 60
|- align="center" bgcolor="CCFFCC"
| 64 || 4 || Pittsburgh Penguins || 2-1 (OT) || Prudential Center||17,625 || 29-31-4 || 62
|- align="center" bgcolor="CCFFCC"
| 65 || 6 || @ New York Islanders || 3-2 (SO) || Nassau Veterans Memorial Coliseum||15,893 || 30-31-4 || 64
|- align="center" bgcolor="FFBBBB"
| 66 || 8 || Ottawa Senators || 1-2 || Prudential Center||15,978 || 30-32-4 || 64
|- align="center" bgcolor="CCFFCC"
| 67 || 11 || @ Atlanta Thrashers || 3-2 (OT) || Philips Arena||16,073 || 31-32-4 || 66
|- align="center" bgcolor="CCFFCC"
| 68 || 12 || New York Islanders || 3-2 (OT) || Prudential Center||17,625 || 32-32-4 || 68
|- align="center" bgcolor="CCFFCC"
| 69 || 15 || Atlanta Thrashers || 4-2 || Prudential Center||16,188 || 33-32-4 || 70
|- align="center" bgcolor="FFBBBB"
| 70 || 17 || @ Ottawa Senators || 1-3 || Scotiabank Place||17,758 || 33-33-4 || 70
|- align="center" bgcolor="FFBBBB"
| 71 || 18 || Washington Capitals || 0-3 || Prudential Center||17,625 || 33-34-4 || 70
|- align="center" bgcolor="CCFFCC"
| 72 || 20 || @ Columbus Blue Jackets || 3-0 || Nationwide Arena||13,043 || 34-34-4 || 72
|- align="center" bgcolor="FFBBBB"
| 73 || 22 || @ Boston Bruins || 1-4 || TD Garden||17,565 || 34-35-4 || 72
|- align="center" bgcolor="BBBBBB"
| 74 || 25 || @ Pittsburgh Penguins || 0-1 (SO) || Consol Energy Center||18,329 || 34-35-5 || 73
|- align="center" bgcolor="FFBBBB"
| 75 || 26 || @ Buffalo Sabres || 0-2 || HSBC Arena||18,690 || 34-36-5 || 73
|- align="center" bgcolor="CCFFCC"
| 76 || 30 || New York Islanders || 3-2 || Prudential Center||16,252 || 35-36-5 || 75
|-

|- align="center" bgcolor="CCFFCC"
| 77 || 1 || Philadelphia Flyers || 4-2 || Prudential Center||17,625 || 36-36-5 || 77
|- align="center" bgcolor="FFBBBB"
| 78 || 2 || Montreal Canadiens || 1-3 || Prudential Center||17,625 || 36-37-5 || 77
|- align="center" bgcolor="FFBBBB"
| 79 || 5 || @ Pittsburgh Penguins || 2-4 || Consol Energy Center||18,331 || 36-38-5 || 77
|- align="center" bgcolor="CCFFCC"
| 80 || 6 || Toronto Maple Leafs || 4-2 || Prudential Center||14,207 || 37-38-5 || 79
|- align="center" bgcolor="FFBBBB"
| 81 || 9 || @ New York Rangers || 2-5 || Madison Square Garden||18,200 || 37-39-5 || 79
|- align="center" bgcolor="CCFFCC"
| 82 || 10 || Boston Bruins || 3-2 || Prudential Center||17,625 || 38-39-5 || 81
|-

|-
| 2010-11 Schedule

Player statistics

Skaters
Note: GP = Games played; G = Goals; A = Assists; Pts = Points; +/− = Plus/Minus; PIM = Penalty Minutes

Goaltenders

†Denotes player spent time with another team before joining Devils. Stats reflect time with Devils only.
‡Traded mid-season. Stats reflect time with Devils only.

Awards and records

Awards

Records

Milestones

Transactions 
The Devils have been involved in the following transactions during the 2010–11 season.

Trades 

|}

Free agents acquired

Free agents lost

Lost via waivers

Player signings

Draft picks 
New Jersey's picks at the 2010 NHL Entry Draft in Los Angeles, California.

Farm teams 
The Albany Devils (relocated from Lowell) of the American Hockey League and the Trenton Devils of the ECHL remain the New Jersey Devils' minor league affiliates for the 2010–11 season.

See also 
 2010–11 NHL season

References

External links 
2010–11 New Jersey Devils season at ESPN
2010–11 New Jersey Devils season at Hockey Reference

New Jersey Devils seasons
New Jersey Devils
New Jersey Devils
New Jersey Devils
New Jersey Devils
21st century in Newark, New Jersey